Blood for Dracula is a 1974 horror film written and directed by Paul Morrissey and starring Udo Kier, Joe Dallesandro, Maxime McKendry, Stefania Casini, Arno Juerging, and Vittorio de Sica. Upon its initial 1974 release in West Germany and the United States, Blood for Dracula was released as Andy Warhol's Dracula.

The film involves Count Dracula arriving in Italy to feast upon the blood of virgins, only to find difficulty with this due to the lack of virgins present in Italy.

Filming began shortly after the completion of Flesh for Frankenstein. Italian director Antonio Margheriti is credited in Italian prints of the film despite not directing it. This misattribution led both producer Carlo Ponti and Margheriti to be put on trial for "continued and aggravated fraud against the state" by attempting to gain benefits by law for Italian films.

According to the American Film Institute, the film opened to mixed reviews.

Plot
In the early 1920s, a sickly and dying Count Dracula, who must drink virgin blood to survive, travels from Transylvania to pre-Fascist Italy, following his servant Anton's plan and thinking he will be more likely to find a virgin in a Catholic country. At the same time, all of Dracula's family has vanished because of the lack of virgins in their hometown, and because that family's reputation discourages others, particularly women, from going near Dracula's castle. Shortly after arriving in Italy, Dracula befriends Il Marchese di Fiore (de Sica), an impecunious Italian landowner who, with a lavish estate falling into decline, is willing to marry off one of his four daughters to the wealthy aristocrat.

Of di Fiore's four daughters, Saphiria and Rubinia regularly enjoy the sexual services of Mario, the estate's handyman, a proud peasant and staunch Marxist who believes that the socialist revolution will happen soon in his country. Esmeralda and Perla, the eldest and youngest of the four, respectively are virgins. Esmeralda is seen as too plain and past her prime for marriage, and Perla is only 14 years old (though she is portrayed by 23-year-old Dionisio). Dracula obtains assurances that all the daughters are virgins and drinks the blood of the two who are considered marriageable. However, their "tainted" blood reveals to him the truth and makes him even weaker. Nevertheless, he is able to telepathically turn the two girls into his slaves.

Soon after the Marchese di Fiore travels out of Italy to pay his great debts, Mario discovers that Dracula is a vampire and what he has done to the di Fiore sisters. When he realizes the danger Dracula poses to Perla, the youngest, he uses the excuse of protecting her to rape her. Mario then warns di Fiore's wife, La Marchesa di Fiore, about Dracula's plan. Meanwhile, Dracula has drunk the blood of Esmeralda, turning her into a vampire and regaining his strength. La Marchesa confronts Anton, and after he stabs her, she fatally shoots him before succumbing herself to her wound. Mario kills Dracula and Esmeralda, becoming the de facto master and manager of the estate.

Cast
 Udo Kier as Count Dracula
 Joe Dallesandro as Mario Balato, the worker
 Arno Juerging as Anton, Dracula's manservant
 Vittorio de Sica as Il Marchese di Fiore
 Maxime McKendry as La Marchesa di Fiore
 Milena Vukotic as Esmeralda
 Dominique Darel as Saphiria
 Stefania Casini as Rubinia
 Silvia Dionisio as Perla
 Roman Polański (uncredited) as man in tavern

Production

In 1973, Paul Morrissey and Joe Dallesandro came to Italy to shoot a film for producers Andrew Braunsberg and Carlo Ponti. The original idea came from director Roman Polanski who had met Morrissey when promoting his film What? with Morrissey stating that Polanski felt he would be "a natural person to make a 3-D film about Frankenstein. I thought it was the most absurd option I could imagine." Morrissey convinced Ponti to not just make one film during this period, but two which led to the production of both Flesh for Frankenstein and Blood for Dracula.

One day after the principal shooting for Flesh for Frankenstein was completed, Morrissey had Udo Kier, Dallesandro and Arno Juerging to get shorter hair cuts, as filming for Blood for Dracula began immediately. The film featured other directors in the cast, including Vittorio De Sica, who wrote his own lines on the set. Roman Polanski also made a cameo in a tavern scene. Despite other sources' claims, Polanski was not shooting What? at the time in Italy, as that film had already been released in Italy by the time the film Blood for Dracula went into production. On its release, the film was promoted with Andy Warhol's name. When asked about how he contributed to the film, Warhol responded that "I go to the parties," following up that "All of us at The Factory contribute ideas."

Italian credits of the film give different credits, including stating Tonino Guerra wrote the screenplay and story, and Franca Silvi edited the film as opposed to Jed Johnson. Antonio Margheriti is credited as the director in the Italian prints, which he later claimed was not true, but that he did direct scenes with Silvia Dionisio and Vittorio de Sica. Udo Kier has stated that other cast members and himself only received direction from Morrissey and that he never saw Margheriti on the set. Margheriti credit was due to Carlo Ponti having an Italian credited in order to obtain benefits by law for Italian films. Ponti and Margheriti were both put on trial later "continued and aggravated fraud against the state".

Release
Blood for Dracula was first released as Andy Warhol's Dracula in both West Germany on 1 March 1974 and the United States on 6 November 1974. A 98-minute version was released theatrically by Euro International Films in Italy on 14 August 1975 as Dracula cerca sangue di vergine e...morì di sete!!!. In Italy, the film grossed a total of 345,023,314 Italian lire. In the United Kingdom, the film passed with cuts to 103 minutes, avoiding being labeled as a video nasty  (However, the film was included on  a tertiary list of titles that could potentially be subject to seizure by police in England. It was therefore not submitted for video certification by the BBFC until 1995, which was granted, with approx. 4 minutes of cuts. An uncut version was not released in the UK until 2006). Louis Periano, who distributed the film in the United States, later tried to cash in the success of Mel Brooks' film Young Frankenstein and re-released the film as a 94-minute R-rated Young Dracula in 1976 (as opposed to the original X-rated version).

Reception
According to the American Film Institute, the film opened to mixed reviews. The Hollywood Reporter lauded the production design by Enrico Job and Luigi Kuveiller's photography. The Los Angeles Times review described the film as "aesthetically pleasing" and "pretty funny up until that Grand Guignol finale" but felt that Morrissey had too much talent for "such sickening junk."

See also
 Vampire films
 Andy Warhol filmography

References

Bibliography

External links
 
 
 
Blood for Dracula an essay by Maurice Yacowar at the Criterion Collection

Dracula films
1974 films
1974 horror films
Italian horror films
Italian LGBT-related films
Italian vampire films
French horror films
French LGBT-related films
French vampire films
English-language French films
English-language Italian films
Films directed by Paul Morrissey
Films set in Italy
Films set in Rome
Films set in the 1920s
Films shot in Serbia
Incest in film
Italian independent films
LGBT-related horror films
French independent films
Films set in Serbia
1974 LGBT-related films
Censored films
Films set in castles
1970s English-language films
1970s Italian films
1970s French films